= Exo Travel =

Thai travel and holiday company

- Company type: Private
- Industry: Tourism
- Predecessor: Exotissimo
- Founded: 1993
- Founders: Eric Merlin; Denis Colonna; Olivier Colomes
- Number of locations: 9
- Area served: South Asia
- Number of employees: 700
- Parent: Apple Tree Group
- Website: exotravel.com

Exo Travel, formerly Exotissimo, is a company which provides services to tourists in South Asia. It was the first foreign company to be granted a tourism operating license in Vietnam. In 2015, Exotissimo has 20 offices and about 700 full-time staff. Its head office is in Bangkok, Thailand, and it has sales offices in France, Germany, Australia, USA, the UK and Ireland and Latin America.

== History ==
Exotissimo was founded in 1993 in Ho Chi Minh City by Eric Merlin, Denis Colonna and Olivier Colomes. The company started by operating tours in Vietnam.

In 1995 Exotissimo partnered with local entrepreneur Su Su Tin and Exo Travel Myanmar, was born.
